The Cercado de Lima (Walled Lima), Damero de Pizarro (Pizarro's Checkerboard),  or Lima Cuadrada (Squared Lima) is an area of the historic center of Lima (capital of Peru) located within the old walls of the city.

Location and history
The area of the Cercado de Lima corresponds to the original layout of the city. Its current boundaries within the city are the Rímac River to the north, Abancay Avenue to the east, Colmena Avenue to the south and Tacna Avenue to the west.

Its name derives from it being the oldest and most central part of the city and because its urban layout maintains the classic Spanish style of streets and perpendicular avenues that form homogeneously square blocks.

The area contains the main historical monuments of the city and several of the public buildings of the government of Peru including the Government Palace and the Cathedral of Lima.

References

Geography of Lima
Historic districts